DJ Tranzo is an underground Chicano disc jockey and emcee from Phoenix, Arizona who started his career in 1994 playing house parties and local events. He is the brother of local cholo rapper MC Bener One, who also started his career in 1994. Tranzo produced Bener One's notable tracks "Best of the Best" and "Shake Ur Rearview" in 2008. The latter was featured on Bener One's Hip Hop Cholo Vol. 1. Tranzo is signed to local Phoenix label Krown Entertainment.

Tranzo played at the Arizona Super Show for Lowrider Magazine in 2008. In 2010, Tranzo was nominated for "Top Phoenix Hip hop DJ" at the 2010 Online Hip-Hop Awards. In 2019, he played at the Phoenix's Winter Wonderland show co-sponsored by local businesses. Tranzo is an active DJ and did live shows on tour in early 2020 prior to the COVID-19 pandemic in the United States. Since then, he has posted new mixes on his YouTube channel.

References

External links 
House Mix (1995) by DJ Tranzo via Mixcloud
EDM Pop Dance Mix (2013) via Mixcloud
Nu Funk Mix (2020) via YouTube
Latin Remix Set (2020) via YouTube

American DJs
Electronic dance music DJs
Living people
Underground hip hop producers
Year of birth missing (living people)